Eosclerocalyptus is an extinct genus of glyptodont. It lived during the Late Miocene, and its fossilized remains were discovered in South America.

Description

This animal, like all glyptodonts, was protected by a carapace covering most of its body. It was very similar to Sclerocalyptus, from which it was only differentiated by its smaller size and some anatomical details, notably on its carapace. The central figures of the osteoderms were depressed, while the caudal tube protecting the tail had fewer lateral figures than those of Sclerocalyptus (only three pairs), and those were less differentiated. The cephalic shield had a particular ornementation. The skull was tall and narrow, especially in the posterior region, and the choanae were tall and narrow. The teeth were thinner than those of Sclerocalyptus, and only the rearmost ones were trilobed.

Classification

The genus Eosclerocalyptus was first described in 1919 by Carlos Ameghino, based on fossils found in terrains dated from the Late Miocene of Argentina. Various species were attributed to this genus, such as Eosclerocalyptus tapinocephalus, E. lineatus, E. proximus and E. planus. Several species from this genus were previously ascribed to the genus Hoplophractus.

Eosclerocalyptus is a genus of glyptodont close to the ancestry of Neosclerocalyptus.

Bibliography
A. A. Tauber. 2005. Mamíferos fósiles y edad de la Formación Salicas (Mioceno tardío) de la sierra de Velasco, La Rioja, Argentina. Ameghiniana 42(2):443-460
Zurita, A. E.; Aramayo, S. A. 2007. New remains of Eosclerocalyptus tapinocephalus (Cabrera) (mammalia, xenarthra, glyptodontidae): Description and implications for its taxonomic status. Rivista Italiana di Paleontologia e Stratigrafia (Research In Paleontology and Stratigraphy), [S.l.], v. 113, n. 1. ISSN 2039-4942.

Prehistoric cingulates
Prehistoric placental genera
Miocene xenarthrans
Miocene mammals of South America
Miocene extinctions
Neogene Argentina
Fossils of Argentina
Fossil taxa described in 1919